William H. Hurlbut (January 8, 1837 – after 1900) was an American politician who served as a member of the Wisconsin State Assembly.

Biography
Born in Venice, New York, Hurlbut attended Cortland Academy in nearby Homer and became a physician. After moving to Wisconsin and residing in Clinton and then Beloit, he settled in Elkhorn in 1870.

Assembly career
Hurlbut was elected to the Assembly in 1896 and 1898. He was a Republican.

References

People from Cayuga County, New York
People from Homer, New York
Politicians from Beloit, Wisconsin
People from Elkhorn, Wisconsin
Republican Party members of the Wisconsin State Assembly
Physicians from Wisconsin
1837 births
Year of death missing
People from Clinton, Rock County, Wisconsin